From 1988-2002, CBS Sports televised a portion of the annual College World Series.

History
From 1988-1990, CBS only televised the championship game. From 1991 until the end of their coverage in 2002, CBS televised one game on the first Saturday of the World Series besides the championship game.

Format change
Prior to 1988, the College World Series was a pure double-elimination event. Beginning in 1988, the tournament was divided into two four-team double-elimination brackets, with the survivors of each bracket playing in a single championship game. The single-game championship was made for broadcast television, with the final game on CBS on Saturday afternoon. CBS paid approximately $500,000 for the broadcasting rights to the championship game.

The end of CBS' coverage
In 2003, the tournament was shifted entirely to cable on ESPN, which had begun covering all of the other games of the CWS since 1982 (and a partial schedule since 1980). The championship final became a best-of-three series between the two bracket winners, with games scheduled for Saturday, Sunday, and Monday evenings.

In 2015, college baseball returned to CBS Sports in the form of a multi-year agreement between the American Athletic Conference and CBS Sports Network. Under the terms of the package, CBS Sports Network would air three Houston Baseball games in 2015, as well as the first two contests of the 2015 American Athletic Conference Baseball Championship. Carter Blackburn provided play-by-play for all seven games of the package, while analyst duties would be handled Darryl Hamilton and Ray King along with Brandon Tierney.

Commentators

1980s

1990s

2000s

References

External links
College Baseball - CBSSports.com
NCAA Men's College World Series Records - CWS TELEVISION RATINGS (1997-2002)

CBS Sports
College baseball on television in the United States
CBS original programming
CBS
1988 American television series debuts
2002 American television series endings
1990s American television series
CBS Sports Spectacular